Gottfried Böhm (23 January 1920 – 9 June 2021) was a German architect and sculptor. His reputation is based on creating highly sculptural buildings made of concrete, steel, and glass. Böhm's first independent building was the Cologne chapel "Madonna in the Rubble" (now integrated into Peter Zumthor's design of the Kolumba museum renovation).  The chapel was completed in 1949 where a medieval church once stood before it was destroyed during World War II. Böhm's most influential and recognized building is the Maria, Königin des Friedens pilgrimage church in Neviges.

In 1986, he became the first German architect to be awarded the prestigious Pritzker Prize. Among the most recently completed construction projects involving Böhm are the Hans Otto Theater in Potsdam (2006) and the Cologne Central Mosque, completed in 2018.

Early life
Böhm was born in Offenbach am Main near Frankfurt on 23 January 1920.  He was the youngest of three children of Maria and Dominikus Böhm.  His father was renowned for his numerous avant-garde churches throughout Germany, many in Expressionist style.  His grandfather was also an architect.  Böhm was conscripted into the Wehrmacht at the outset of World War II.  He served until he was injured in 1942 during Operation Barbarossa and consequently returned to Germany.  After graduating from the Technische Hochschule, Munich, in 1946, he studied sculpture at a nearby fine-arts academy. Gottfried later integrated his clay model making skills acquired during this time at the academy into his design process.

Career
After graduating in 1947, Gottfried worked for his father until the latter's death in 1955, and later took over his firm. During this period, he also worked with the "Society for the Reconstruction of Cologne" under Rudolf Schwarz. In 1951, he traveled to New York City and worked for six months in the architectural firm of Cajetan Baumann. While traveling in the United States he met two of his greatest inspirations, German architects Ludwig Mies van der Rohe and Walter Gropius.

In the following decades, Böhm constructed many buildings around Germany, including museums, civic centers, office buildings, homes, apartment buildings and churches.  He is considered to have been both an expressionist and post-Bauhaus architect, but he preferred to define himself as an architect who created "connections" between the past and the future, between the world of ideas and the physical world, between a building and its urban surroundings. In this vein, Böhm always envisioned the color, form, and materials of a building in relationship with its setting. His earlier projects were done mostly in molded concrete, but more recently he employed more steel and glass in his buildings due to the technical advancements in both materials. His concern for urban planning is evident in many of his projects, harping back to his emphasis on "connections". In addition to Germany, Böhm designed buildings in Los Angeles, Tokyo, and Turin, Italy.

A 2014 documentary titled "Concrete Love – The Böhm Family" explores Gottfried's relationship with his sons and his wife.

Personal life
Böhm was married to Elizabeth Haggenmüller, also an architect, until her death in 2012. He met her in 1948 while studying in Munich. She assisted him in several of his projects, mainly through interior design. Together, they had four sons: Stephan, Peter, Paul and Markus.  The first three also became architects, while Markus worked as a painter.  Böhm turned 100 in January 2020.

Böhm died on the night of 9 June 2021 at his home in Cologne, aged 101. The cause of death was not disclosed.

Notable buildings

1947–50 St. Kolumba, Cologne
1962–69 Bensberg City Hall
1968–72 Maria, Königin des Friedens pilgrimage church, Neviges
1968–70  (Church of Resurrection), Cologne

Awards
1968 – Eduard-von-der-Heydt Prize from the city of Wuppertal
1971 – Architecture Prize of the Association of German Architects, Düsseldorf
1974 – Berlin Art Prize of the Academy of Arts, Berlin
1975 – Big BDA award of the Association of German Architects, Bonn
1977 – Honorary Professor F. Villareal National University, Lima, Peru
1982 – Grande Medaille d'Or d'Architecture, L'Académie d'Architecture in Paris, France
1983 – Honorary Membership / Honorary Member of the American Institute of Architects AIA
1985 – Fritz Schumacher Prize, Hamburg
1985 – Honorary doctorate, Technical University of Munich
1985/1986 – Price Cret Chair at the University of Pennsylvania, Philadelphia, Pennsylvania, United States
1986 – Pritzker Architecture Prize, Chicago, US
1987 – Gebhard Fugel Prize, Munich
1993 – Rheinischer Kulturpreis

References

External links

 
 Pritzker Prize page on Gottfried Böhm

1920 births
2021 deaths
People from Offenbach am Main
20th-century German architects
Brutalist architects
German sculptors
Members of the European Academy of Sciences and Arts
Members of the Academy of Arts, Berlin
Pritzker Architecture Prize winners
Technical University of Munich alumni
Polytechnic University of Catalonia
Academic staff of RWTH Aachen University
German centenarians
Men centenarians
German Army personnel of World War II